Château Klinglin is a château in the commune of Illkirch-Graffenstaden, in the department of Bas-Rhin, Alsace, France. Built in 1735, it became a Monument historique in 1970.

References

Châteaux in Bas-Rhin
Monuments historiques of Bas-Rhin
Houses completed in 1735
1735 establishments in France